Hysteric Glamour is a Japanese designer label created by artist Nobuhiko Kitamura in 1984.

Operations
The theme of the label is 1960s mass media, with t-shirts depicting musicians like Marc Bolan and the Sex Pistols, and art work by Andy Warhol. Other themes include comics, pornography, automobiles, package designs and neon signs. The Hysteric Glamour label covers a wide variety of clothing including T-shirts, jeans, cardigans, frilly tank tops, mini dresses, and accessories.

There are currently 51 stores in Japan in areas like Harajuku, Aoyama, Shibuya and Shinjuku. International stores exist in Hong Kong, London and Paris, although there are no stores in the United States.

Hysteric Glamour is mentioned by Gwen Stefani in her song "Harajuku Girls".

, Hysteric Glamour has partnered with Playboy to create fashion wear.

On the 14 September 2017, Hysteric Glamour collaborated with Supreme (brand). Included in the collaboration were belts, work jackets, jumpers, beanies, and coffee mugs. This was part of the F/W 17 collection.

References

External links
 (in English)

Clothing brands of Japan